John Costanza (born August 14, 1943, in Dover, New Jersey) is an American comic book artist and letterer. He has worked for both DC Comics and Marvel Comics. He was the letterer during Alan Moore's acclaimed run on Swamp Thing. The bulk of Costanza's art assignments have been for anthropomorphic animal comics and children-oriented material.

Biography
Costanza began his career in 1965, working as Joe Kubert's assistant on the syndicated newspaper strip Tales of the Green Berets. Costanza soon started to work for comic books, both as an artist and a letterer. He started out with contributing to DC titles like G.I. Combat and House of Mystery in the period 1968-1971. He began freelancing for Marvel (exclusively as a letterer) in 1972, at first under the alias Jon Costa. He would soon become one of the company's premier letterers, working on flagship titles such as Fantastic Four and The Amazing Spider-Man, and lettering special projects such as the Stan Lee/Jack Kirby Silver Surfer novel (Silver Surfer: The Ultimate Cosmic Experience) published by Fireside Books in 1978.

During the 1970s he produced comics with Warner Bros.' Looney Tunes/Merrie Melodies characters for Western Publishing. 

For Marvel in 1980s, Costanza drew comics with Heathcliff, the Get Along Gang, and Hugga Bunch. 

In the 1990s, he returned to Warner Bros. comics, this time for DC's Looney Tunes and Animaniacs titles. He also did stories with Roger Rabbit and Mickey Mouse for Walt Disney Studios. Costanza has also drawn issues of Matt Groening's The Simpsons comics.

Bibliography (selected)

Lettering
Green Lantern/Green Arrow (with writer Denny O'Neil and artists Neal Adams and Dick Giordano, DC, 1970-1972)
The New Gods (with writer/artist Jack Kirby, DC, 1971)
Mister Miracle (with writer/artist Jack Kirby, DC, 1971)
The Forever People (with writer/artist Jack Kirby, DC, 1971)
Conan the Barbarian (with writer Roy Thomas and artists Barry Smith and John Buscema, Marvel, 1972–1978)
Tomb of Dracula (with writer Marv Wolfman, penciller Gene Colan, and inker Tom Palmer Marvel, 1972–1979)
Doctor Strange (with writers Steve Englehart, Marv Wolfman, Jim Starlin, and Roger Stern and artists Frank Brunner, Gene Colan, Rudy Nebres, Al Milgrom, Tom Sutton, and Tom Palmer, Marvel, 1974–1979)
The Invaders (with writer Roy Thomas, penciller Frank Robbins, and inker Frank Springer, Marvel, 1975–1978)
Legion of Super-Heroes (with writer Paul Levitz and penciller Keith Giffen, DC, 1982–1984)
Camelot 3000 (with writer Mike W. Barr and penciller Brian Bolland, DC, 1982–1985
Ronin (with writer/artist Frank Miller, 6-issue limited series, DC, 1983–1984)
Crisis on Infinite Earths (with writer Marv Wolfman and penciller George Pérez, DC, 1985–1986)
Swamp Thing (with writer Alan Moore, DC/Vertigo, 1985–1994)
The Dark Knight Returns (with writer/penciler Frank Miller and inks by Klaus Janson, 4-issue limited series, DC, 1986)
Wonder Woman (with writer/artist George Pérez, DC, 1987–1989)
Batman: The Cult (with writer Jim Starlin and penciller Bernie Wrightson, 4-issue limited series, DC, 1988)
Batman: A Death in the Family (with writer Jim Starlin and penciller Jim Aparo, 4-issue storyline, DC, 1988–1989)
Batman: A Lonely Place of Dying (with writers Marv Wolfman and George Perez and pencillers Jim Aparo and Tom Grummett, 5-issue storyline, DC, 1989)
Sandman Mystery Theatre (with writers Matt Wagner and Steven T. Seagle, Vertigo, 1993–1999)
Captain America (with writer Mark Waid and penciller Ron Garney, Marvel, 1995–1996)
Scene of the Crime (with writer Ed Brubaker and penciller Michael Lark, Vertigo, 2000)
Red (with writer Warren Ellis and artist Cully Hamner, 3-issue storyline, Wildstorm, 2003)

Awards
Costanza's lettering has been recognized by both peers and fans. The Academy of Comic Book Arts named him Best Letterer of 1974 (the Shazam Award), and in 1986 and 1987 he won the Comics Buyer's Guide Fan Award for Favorite Letterer for his work on Swamp Thing.

References

 
 John Costanza at Lambiek' Comiclopedia

1943 births
Living people
American comics artists
Comic book letterers
People from Dover, New Jersey